is a railway station on Kintetsu Osaka Line in Kashiba, Nara, Japan, and is the central station in the eastern area of the city.

Layout
The station has island platforms serving 4 tracks on the first floor. Ticket machines and ticket gates are located in the footbridge.

Surroundings
Kintetsu Goido Workshop
Mamigaoka New Town
JR Goido Station (JR West Wakayama Line)

Stations next to Goido Station

References

Railway stations in Japan opened in 1927
Railway stations in Nara Prefecture